Knight & Lee was a department store in Southsea, Hampshire, England. The store was acquired by the John Lewis Partnership in 1933 and was one of only two stores remaining which does not trade under the John Lewis & Partners name. The shop officially closed on 13 July 2019. The proceeds from the sale of the freehold will fill a gap in the John Lewis pension deficit.

Pre-partnership history
The store was originally a lace business operated by Mr William Wink in Queens Street. In 1857 William Wink died and his wife took over the business and it was listed as a 'lace manufacturer, milliner and dressmaker'. By 1865 Frederick Wink had taken over the business.

Frederick moved the business to the more fashionable Palmerston Road in Southsea in 1874. The business expanded with purchase of further premises in Palmerston Road and increased its offering to become a department store.

In 1887 brothers-in-law Jesse Knight and Edward Herbert Soden Lee purchased the business. They had previously worked for William Whitley in Bayswater, and brought a Mr Brown with them as General Manager. The business was greatly expanded by a novel boyswear department which was followed by a menswear department. In 1899 the business was incorporated.

In 1908 they purchased a former fishmongers on the corner of Stanley Lane and Palmerston Road. This was eventually joined by further purchases along Palmerston Road that joined the stores together, with the buildings being rebuilt in 1910. In 1922 Mr Knight died, with Mr Lee dying two years later. Mr Brown who had joined the business from Whitleys when Knight & Lee had purchased the business, ran the business until the John Lewis partnership bought the business in 1933.

After John Lewis purchase
By 1937 John Lewis were announcing that Knight and Lee had increased its turnover to £100,000.
However, World War II saw destruction to Portsmouth and Knight & Lee was no different. In 1940 the store was hit in an air raid, but was re-opened but was then destroyed by incendiary bomb on 10 January 1941. The business however quickly recovered by opening offices in the nearby Queen's Hotel and opening premises in Palmerston Arcade by 24 February. By 1950 the business had expanded into further premises next to Palmerston Arcade, with further premises in Elm Grove. In 1955 it was announced that a new purpose built building was to be constructed on the corner of Palmerston Road. The store opened in 1959 with all bar the boyswear and menswear departments operating in the new premises.

However, in 2004 the business was under threat as John Lewis had agreed to become an anchor store for the new Portsmouth Northern Quarter development. The development was put on hold by Portsmouth City Council in 2005; however, the scheme was resurrected by developers and locals were worried that Knight & Lee would close. However, in 2014 John Lewis announced that Knight & Lee would be staying in Southsea.

In 2018, the freehold of the building was sold by John Lewis and on 23 January 2019 it was announced that the store would close in July.

In July 2019, John Lewis announced the closure of the Knight & Lee store in Southsea, after trading for more than 150 years. The outlet is one of only two John Lewis shops in the UK to retain its original name and the first to be shut by the retailer since 2006.

References

External links
 Knight and Lee at johnlewis.com
 John Lewis Memory Store

Department stores of the United Kingdom
John Lewis Partnership
Buildings and structures in Portsmouth
Department store buildings in the United Kingdom
Organisations based in Portsmouth